Azhar Mahmood (born 28 February 1975) is a Pakistani cricket coach and former cricketer. He was the bowling coach of the Pakistani national cricket team until 2019.

Previously, he played Tests and ODIs for Pakistan national cricket team and county cricket in England. Azhar is a dual British citizen.

Personal life
Azhar Mahmood's wedding ceremony was held in 2003; his wife is British Pakistani.

Domestic career
As a teenager, Azhar was mentored by Irfan Bhatti who played a One Day International for Pakistan in the early 1990s. Originally his father objected to his interest in cricket, but later started to appreciate it seeing his accomplishments. When not doing net practice, Azhar would fancy himself playing tape ball cricket on the cemented pitch in the cricket ground in front of his home.

He played county cricket for Surrey and in November 2007 signed a two-year deal to play for Kent.

Azhar became a British citizen in 2011. This allowed him to play for Kent as an English-qualified player, further distancing himself from a recall to the Pakistan side.

It was announced that Azhar would be playing for the Auckland Aces as one of their overseas professionals in the 2011/12 season. In the 2012 IPL auction, Mahmood was sold to Kings XI Punjab for $200,000, double his base price of $100,000. In 2015, he was signed by KKR as replacement for James Neesham and played a few matches but was dropped from the squad the very next season.

He along with Isuru Udana set the highest 8th wicket partnership in all forms of T20s (120) during the inaugural SLPL league in 2012.

International career

Early days
Azhar made his One-Day International debut against India in 1996 at Toronto Cricket Club, Toronto, but did not gain major recognition until his Test debut against South Africa the following year at Rawalpindi Cricket Stadium, Rawalpindi when he hit a century and a half-century without being dismissed. He later went on to score two more centuries against the South Africans.

He joined the Pakistani team primarily as a medium pacer but he has surprised many by his batting powers. His hard hitting but orthodox batting skills have also been extremely useful in the one-day game. Unlike most Pakistani pacers who are swing bowlers, he is a useful English-style seam bowler, who can chip in with wickets in time of need.

In 2000, Lt-General Tauqir Zia, then the PCB chairman, said that the board would choose the next captain – not based on seniority alone – and if people find the choice unacceptable they will not be selected. Later – in front of some senior players – he told Azhar Mahmood that he will be the next Pakistan captain. Together they would plan the future strategy. But until now this never came to pass.

Comeback

He was recalled to the national side for the ODI series against South Africa in early 2007, but subsequently dropped when the 2007 Cricket World Cup team was announced. He was however recalled to go with the squad to the West Indies after a knee injury to Abdul Razzaq. It was Mahmood's 3rd World Cup.

However, aside from playing in a practice match, Azhar did not get a chance to participate in the World Cup and Pakistan's early exit from the tournament meant that he was once again, in line for being axed from the national squad. Following his exclusion, Azhar returned to playing county cricket in UK. Over the years, due to his constant exclusion from the Pakistani squad and the fact that he has crossed the 30-year-old mark, it seems that Mahmood is not as interested in returning to the Pakistani line up as he once was. His weight gain, mediocre performances in ODIs, combined with the tough competition for the all rounder slot in the Pakistani line up meant that his chances for making a return to the national squad were very limited. He has previously signed with the defunct Indian Cricket League (ICL) and had been released from his central contract.

Coaching career

In November 2016, Mehmood was appointed bowling coach of the Pakistan side. Earlier the same year, he had served 2 short stints in a similar capacity, also for the national team.

Mehmood also served as the bowling coach of two PSL Franchises Karachi Kings & Multan Sultans.

On 3 December 2021, Mehmood has appointed by Islamabad United as the Head Coach for their 7th season of PSL.

Trivia
Wisden in 2001 included Azhar Mahmood's innings of 132 for Pakistan against South Africa at Kingsmead Cricket Ground, Durban in 1997–98 as the 8th best Test Innings of All Time in its list of Wisden 100. It mentioned – "South Africa's pace attack had more depth than at any other time in their history: Allan Donald and Shaun Pollock supported by Fanie de Villiers and Lance Klusener. No surprise that Pakistan were put in to bat on a treacherous pitch – or that they should be reduced to 89 for 5. Salvation came in the form of a 22-year-old allrounder who seemed to be batting too low at No.7: his century was already his third in six Test innings against South Africa. Tucking into a great pace bowler like Donald, he scored 96 runs in boundaries while proving himself an expert shepherd of a tail: he made 90% of Pakistan's last 106 runs. They went on to win a low-scoring match by 29."

References

External links

 
 

1975 births
Living people
British people of Punjabi descent
Pakistani cricketers
Pakistan One Day International cricketers
Pakistan Test cricketers
Kent cricketers
Surrey cricketers
Rawalpindi cricketers
Auckland cricketers
Barbados Royals cricketers
Fortune Barishal cricketers
Cricketers at the 1999 Cricket World Cup
Cricketers at the 2003 Cricket World Cup
Cricketers from Rawalpindi
Cricketers who made a century on Test debut
Cape Cobras cricketers
Dhaka Dominators cricketers
English cricketers
English cricket coaches
Habib Bank Limited cricketers
ICL Pakistan XI cricketers
Islamabad cricketers
Islamabad Leopards cricketers
Islamabad United cricketers
Lahore Badshahs cricketers
Marylebone Cricket Club cricketers
Naturalised citizens of the United Kingdom
Pakistan International Airlines cricketers
Pakistani cricket coaches
Pakistani emigrants to the United Kingdom
Punjab Kings cricketers
Sydney Thunder cricketers
United Bank Limited cricketers
Wayamba United cricketers